This is a list of state forests in Illinois.

Illinois state forests

See also
 List of U.S. National Forests

References

Forests
Lists of state forests in the United States